Vukan Vuletić (born January 21, 1973) is a Serbian diver. He competed at the 1996 Summer Olympics in Atlanta and took 37th place in Men's Platform.

Vuletić is president of Čukarički Diving Club and min coach. He finished his career in 2000, after 20 years of competing.

References

External links
Vukan Vuletić - Sports-Reference.com

1973 births
Living people
Serbian male divers
Olympic divers of Yugoslavia
Divers at the 1996 Summer Olympics